The UConn Huskies women's ice hockey program represented the University of Connecticut Huskies during the 2014–15 NCAA Division I women's ice hockey season.

Offseason

Recruiting

The 2014 recruiting class was notable, in that Shannon Godin filed a lawsuit, alleging that she was the victim of hazing, which led to her hospitalization, and that head coach Chris MacKenzie was both aware of the incident, and that he acted in an abusive manner. A subsequent inquiry by the university confirmed the hazing incident, but did not find MacKenzie at fault

Roster

Goaltending kept the Huskies competitive.  Elaine Chuli remained one of Hockey East's best netminders, while Freshman Annie Belanger emerges as an equally talented backup.  The duo allowed the Huskies to earn a respectable 2.95 Goals Against Average. The offensive efforts of the team did not match the defensive threat.  The Huskies scored only 80 goals, with seniors Emily Snodgrass, Sarah MacDonnell and Kayla Campero scoring nearly half (37) of those goals.  The team's best performance was the Quarterfinal winning game at Maine on February 28, 2015, when Elaine Chuli led the team though a regulation 0-0 tie, while Rebecca Fleming scored the game winning overtime goal.

2014–15 Huskies

Schedule

|-
!colspan=12 style=""| Regular Season

|-
!colspan=12 style=" style=""| WHEA Tournament

Awards and honors
Goaltender Elaine Chuli named team MVP
Elaine Chuli was invited to the Team Canada Development team

Hockey East All-Stars
Elaine Chuli, Honorable Mention

References

UConn Huskies women's ice hockey seasons
Conn
Connect
Connect